Ivan Vishnevskiy may refer to:
Ivan Vishnevskiy (ice hockey)
Ivan Vishnevskiy (footballer)